Sophie-Charlotte-Platz is a Berlin U-Bahn station on line U2.

History
The station was built by A. Grenander and opened in 1908. In 1935, the windows on top were removed. In 1938, the entrances of the station had to be moved. In 1988, twenty-six large paintings were attached to the walls showing the history of the subway before the First World War.

It was heavily damaged by air raids on 15 February 1944.

References 

U2 (Berlin U-Bahn) stations
Buildings and structures in Charlottenburg-Wilmersdorf
Railway stations in Germany opened in 1908